The Central constituency (No.130) was a Russian legislative constituency in Omsk Oblast in 1993–2007. The constituency covered central Omsk. In 2015 redistricting the constituency was dismantled and its territory being split between Omsk, Moskalenki and Lyubinsky constituencies.

Members elected

Election results

1993

|-
! colspan=2 style="background-color:#E9E9E9;text-align:left;vertical-align:top;" |Candidate
! style="background-color:#E9E9E9;text-align:left;vertical-align:top;" |Party
! style="background-color:#E9E9E9;text-align:right;" |Votes
! style="background-color:#E9E9E9;text-align:right;" |%
|-
|style="background-color:"|
|align=left|Sergey Baburin
|align=left|Independent
|
|26.68%
|-
|style="background-color:"|
|align=left|Sergey Nosovets
|align=left|Independent
| -
|22.50%
|-
| colspan="5" style="background-color:#E9E9E9;"|
|- style="font-weight:bold"
| colspan="3" style="text-align:left;" | Total
| 
| 100%
|-
| colspan="5" style="background-color:#E9E9E9;"|
|- style="font-weight:bold"
| colspan="4" |Source:
|
|}

1995

|-
! colspan=2 style="background-color:#E9E9E9;text-align:left;vertical-align:top;" |Candidate
! style="background-color:#E9E9E9;text-align:left;vertical-align:top;" |Party
! style="background-color:#E9E9E9;text-align:right;" |Votes
! style="background-color:#E9E9E9;text-align:right;" |%
|-
|style="background-color:"|
|align=left|Sergey Baburin (incumbent)
|align=left|Power to the People
|
|27.61%
|-
|style="background-color:#3A46CE"|
|align=left|Aleksandr Minzhurenko
|align=left|Democratic Choice of Russia – United Democrats
|
|15.48%
|-
|style="background-color:"|
|align=left|Galina Kirilenko
|align=left|Our Home – Russia
|
|10.38%
|-
|style="background-color:"|
|align=left|Aleksandr Kravets
|align=left|Communist Party
|
|10.30%
|-
|style="background-color:"|
|align=left|Valentin Plotnitsky
|align=left|Liberal Democratic Party
|
|6.25%
|-
|style="background-color:#2998D5"|
|align=left|Viktor Potapov
|align=left|Russian All-People's Movement
|
|3.54%
|-
|style="background-color:#F5821F"|
|align=left|Yury Chesnokov
|align=left|Bloc of Independents
|
|3.17%
|-
|style="background-color:"|
|align=left|Vladimir Slobodyan
|align=left|Independent
|
|1.72%
|-
|style="background-color:#000000"|
|colspan=2 |against all
|
|18.22%
|-
| colspan="5" style="background-color:#E9E9E9;"|
|- style="font-weight:bold"
| colspan="3" style="text-align:left;" | Total
| 
| 100%
|-
| colspan="5" style="background-color:#E9E9E9;"|
|- style="font-weight:bold"
| colspan="4" |Source:
|
|}

1999

|-
! colspan=2 style="background-color:#E9E9E9;text-align:left;vertical-align:top;" |Candidate
! style="background-color:#E9E9E9;text-align:left;vertical-align:top;" |Party
! style="background-color:#E9E9E9;text-align:right;" |Votes
! style="background-color:#E9E9E9;text-align:right;" |%
|-
|style="background-color:"|
|align=left|Aleksandr Vereteno
|align=left|Independent
|
|29.72%
|-
|style="background-color:"|
|align=left|Aleksandr Kravets
|align=left|Communist Party
|
|24.72%
|-
|style="background-color:"|
|align=left|Sergey Baburin (incumbent)
|align=left|Russian All-People's Union
|
|12.01%
|-
|style="background-color:#C21022"|
|align=left|Sergey Kiriyenko
|align=left|Party of Pensioners
|
|4.87%
|-
|style="background-color:"|
|align=left|Igor Basov
|align=left|Unity
|
|3.99%
|-
|style="background-color:"|
|align=left|Yury Redkin
|align=left|Kedr
|
|2.34%
|-
|style="background-color:"|
|align=left|Aleksandr Grass
|align=left|Independent
|
|1.47%
|-
|style="background-color:"|
|align=left|Yevgeny Muzyka
|align=left|Liberal Democratic Party
|
|1.26%
|-
|style="background-color:"|
|align=left|Andrey Shepelin
|align=left|Independent
|
|1.13%
|-
|style="background-color:"|
|align=left|Grigory Mokoseyev
|align=left|Independent
|
|0.82%
|-
|style="background-color:#084284"|
|align=left|Vasily Konovalov
|align=left|Spiritual Heritage
|
|0.61%
|-
|style="background-color:#000000"|
|colspan=2 |against all
|
|15.22%
|-
| colspan="5" style="background-color:#E9E9E9;"|
|- style="font-weight:bold"
| colspan="3" style="text-align:left;" | Total
| 
| 100%
|-
| colspan="5" style="background-color:#E9E9E9;"|
|- style="font-weight:bold"
| colspan="4" |Source:
|
|}

2002
The results of the by-election were annulled due to low turnout (11.92%)

|-
! colspan=2 style="background-color:#E9E9E9;text-align:left;vertical-align:top;" |Candidate
! style="background-color:#E9E9E9;text-align:left;vertical-align:top;" |Party
! style="background-color:#E9E9E9;text-align:right;" |Votes
! style="background-color:#E9E9E9;text-align:right;" |%
|-
|style="background-color:"|
|align=left|Vladimir Vereteno
|align=left|Independent
|
|44.93%
|-
|style="background-color:"|
|align=left|Nikolay Yefimkin
|align=left|Independent
|
|14.16%
|-
|style="background-color:"|
|align=left|Aleksandr Korotkov
|align=left|Independent
|
|10.32%
|-
|style="background-color:"|
|align=left|Ivan Belsky
|align=left|Independent
|
|7.57%
|-
|style="background-color:#000000"|
|colspan=2 |against all
|
|20.13%
|-
| colspan="5" style="background-color:#E9E9E9;"|
|- style="font-weight:bold"
| colspan="3" style="text-align:left;" | Total
| 
| 100%
|-
| colspan="5" style="background-color:#E9E9E9;"|
|- style="font-weight:bold"
| colspan="4" |Source:
|
|}

2003

|-
! colspan=2 style="background-color:#E9E9E9;text-align:left;vertical-align:top;" |Candidate
! style="background-color:#E9E9E9;text-align:left;vertical-align:top;" |Party
! style="background-color:#E9E9E9;text-align:right;" |Votes
! style="background-color:#E9E9E9;text-align:right;" |%
|-
|style="background-color:"|
|align=left|Aleksandr Kharitonov
|align=left|Independent
|
|27.65%
|-
|style="background-color:"|
|align=left|Aleksandr Kravets
|align=left|Communist Party
|
|15.66%
|-
|style="background-color:"|
|align=left|Leonid Mayevsky
|align=left|Independent
|
|9.93%
|-
|style="background-color:"|
|align=left|Dmitry Shustov
|align=left|Independent
|
|6.73%
|-
|style="background-color:"|
|align=left|Valentina Zakharchenko
|align=left|Liberal Democratic Party
|
|4.73%
|-
|style="background:#1042A5"| 
|align=left|Nikolay Yefimkin
|align=left|Union of Right Forces
|
|4.49%
|-
|style="background-color:"|
|align=left|Yury Redkin
|align=left|The Greens
|
|3.47%
|-
|style="background-color:"|
|align=left|Nikolay Gorbatenko
|align=left|Agrarian Party
|
|2.82%
|-
|style="background-color:#00A1FF"|
|align=left|Aleksandr Panychev
|align=left|Party of Russia's Rebirth-Russian Party of Life
|
|2.12%
|-
|style="background-color:"|
|align=left|Aleksandr Grass
|align=left|Independent
|
|1.82%
|-
|style="background-color:"|
|align=left|Dmitry Sapunov
|align=left|Independent
|
|0.71%
|-
|style="background-color:#000000"|
|colspan=2 |against all
|
|18.41%
|-
| colspan="5" style="background-color:#E9E9E9;"|
|- style="font-weight:bold"
| colspan="3" style="text-align:left;" | Total
| 
| 100%
|-
| colspan="5" style="background-color:#E9E9E9;"|
|- style="font-weight:bold"
| colspan="4" |Source:
|
|}

Notes

References

Obsolete Russian legislative constituencies
Politics of Omsk Oblast